Lars Oftedal (3 January 1877 – 19 April 1932) was a Norwegian attorney and newspaper editor.

Biography
Oftedal was born in Stavanger in  Rogaland, Norway.  He was the son of parish priest Lars Oftedal (1838–1900) and his wife Olava Mathilde Ohlsen (1839–1931). His father was the founding editor of Stavanger Aftenblad and also served as a member of the Storting.

Oftedal attended Kongsgaard skole in Stavanger and took  Cand. jur. in 1899. He was editor of Stavanger Aftenblad from 1900 to 1921.
He served with the  Stavanger city council from 1907  until 1921. From 1916 to 1918 he was deputy to the Storting  and was elected as a permanent representative in 1922 and 1925. He was Minister of Social Affairs 1921-1922 and 1924-1926 in Prime Minister Mowinckel's First Cabinet. He served a Minister of Trade 1922-1923 and 1928-1931 in Prime Minister Mowinckel's  Second Cabinet.

Personal life
He was  married to Alice Stephansen (1877-1938). They were the parents of physician Sven Oftedal (1905–1948) and 
newspaper editor Christian S. Oftedal (1907–1955).

References

1877 births
1932 deaths
Politicians from Stavanger
20th-century Norwegian lawyers
Norwegian newspaper editors
Government ministers of Norway
Ministers of Trade and Shipping of Norway